Bone Bolango is a regency of Gorontalo Province, Indonesia, on the island of Sulawesi. It was established in 2003 under Law Number (Undang-Undang Nomor) 6/2003from the former eastern districts of Gorontalo Regency. It has an area of 1,915.44 km2 and had a population of 141,915 at the 2010 Census and 162,778 at the 2020 Census; the official estimate as at mid 2021 was 164,277. The administrative centre of the regency is the town of Suwawa.

Administrative Districts 
Originally comprising four districts (kecamatan) when it was established in 2003, the Regency was by 2010 divided into seventeen districts, and an additional district (Pinogu District) has subsequently been created by the splitting of the existing Suwawa Timur District. The districts are tabulated below with their areas and their populations at the 2010 Census and the 2020 Census, together with the official estimates as at mid 2021. The table also includes the locations of the district administrative centres, the number of administrative villages (rural desa and urban kelurahan) in each district, and its postal codes.

Notes: (a) South Bolango District is a northern suburb of Gorontalo city. (b) the 2010 population of the new Pinogu District is included in the figure for the existing Suwawa Timur District, from which it was cut out.

Beaches and underwater cave
Olele Beach in Kabila Bone District is 27 kilometres from Gorontalo or around an hour's drive on poor condition roads. The beach is ideal for diving to see various giant coral sponges. In the left side of Olele's beach there is vertical Jin Cave with 50 metres depth. Olele Beach is protected from extreme current, so diving can be done day and night along the year. Besides the Olele dive site, there are totaling 23 spots along the southern coast of Gorontalo from Biluhu village to Bilungala village.

References

Regencies of Gorontalo